Feng Gong (born 6 December 1957) is a Chinese actor, xiangsheng performer, director, screenwriter. and politician. He is best known for his performances in the annual CCTV New Year's Gala, having made more appearances on the show than every other major performer.

Biography 
Feng Gong was born Feng Mingguang in Tianjin, China, on December 6, 1957, the son of Feng Haigang (1920-1993), a local government official, and Liu Yisu (born 1921), a daughter of an eminent family. He has an elderly sister, Feng Xingyun (； born 1947) and two elderly brother, Feng Xin and Feng Chuanshu. Feng graduated from Central China Normal University with a master's degree in Chinese Literature.  In 1973, he performed a famous xiangsheng named Zunshi ai tudi in Tianjin. Then he started to learn the arts of xiangsheng from the xiangsheng master Ma Ji. He also worked in a textiles machine factory. Feng was considered more talented than many other students of Ma Ji, and eventually emerged as a new star, performing progressively to bigger venues. Niu Qun and Liu Wei were his partners when performing xiangsheng.

Feng appeared in the first CCTV New Year's Gala in 1986; he has appeared at almost every Chunwan performance for the next thirty years, variably in skits and xiangsheng. Feng is usually one of the first acts of the show; it is said he appears earlier in the program so that he can drive home to Tianjin to spend midnight on new year with his mother.

In 1988, he won the championship at the competition of xiangsheng performances in Dalian held by China Central Television.

Political career
On December 24, 2017, Feng was elected as the vice chairman of the Revolutionary Committee of the Chinese Kuomintang. He was re-elected as the vice chairman on December 6, 2022.

On October 12, 2018, Feng was elected as the new chairman of the China Literary and Art Volunteers' Association (CLAVA) by its 2nd National Congress.

Personal life
Feng is the great grandson of Feng Guozhang (1859-1919), once the president of the Republic of China during the chaotic Warlord era. His grandfather, Feng Jiayu (1888-1953), was a businessman. Feng himself is a leadership figure in the Revolutionary Committee of the Chinese Kuomintang, one of the eight legally recognized political parties in China, as well as a member of the Chinese People's Political Consultative Conference. He is often accosted by reporters during the annual Lianghui meetings in Beijing due to his celebrity status.

1983, Feng Gong married Ai Hui in Tianjin, the couple have a son, Feng Kaicheng, born in 1984.

Filmography

Film

TV series

References

External links 
 

1957 births
Living people
Film directors from Tianjin
Chinese male film actors
Chinese male television actors
Chinese xiangsheng performers
Chinese male stage actors
Male actors from Tianjin
Central China Normal University alumni
Chinese film directors
Members of the Revolutionary Committee of the Chinese Kuomintang
Members of the 9th Chinese People's Political Consultative Conference
Members of the 10th Chinese People's Political Consultative Conference
Members of the Standing Committee of the 11th Chinese People's Political Consultative Conference
Members of the Standing Committee of the 12th Chinese People's Political Consultative Conference
Members of the 13th Chinese People's Political Consultative Conference